Puppet Master X: Axis Rising is a 2012 American action horror film and is the tenth entry in the Puppet Master film series. Produced and directed by Charles Band, it is a direct sequel to 2010's Puppet Master: Axis of Evil and introduces new puppets named Blitzkrieg, Bombshell, Kamikaze, and Weremacht, who fight alongside the Nazis. Puppet Master X: Axis Rising was released on October 9, 2012 by Full Moon Features.

A sequel, Puppet Master: Axis Termination, was released in 2017.

Plot
Ozu, the villain from the previous film, walks down a dark alley only to be stopped by Kommandant Moebius, the Nazi general. Ozu offers him the puppet Tunneler, in exchange for her freedom. Moebius gladly takes the prize, which immediately kills SS Soldier #1. Moebius "sets her free" by shooting her in the head. While this takes place, the puppet Blade watches from the shadows. The next morning, Danny and Beth are recovering at Danny's house. Danny tells the rest of the puppets that he couldn't revive Ninja, but they will get back Tunneler. Blade appears and informs them of Ozu's death and Tunneler's capture by the Nazis. Danny and Beth respond to a knock at the door only to be grabbed by mysterious men in suits. Meanwhile, in a secret lab in Chinatown, Docter Freuhoffer, a captured Austrian doctor with a fixation on dolls, is working for Moebius to develop a machine that can reanimate the dead. The seductive Uschi, a Nazi, tries to motivate the doctor only to be interrupted by Moebius. He demands a demonstration of the machine. He brings in a Japanese man and slits his throat. The machine makes him walk for a moment only for him to decay and fall down. Freuhoffer promises to fix the machine. Moebius reminds him that if he doesn't, his daughter will be killed. He then presents him with Tunneler to study.

Danny and Beth are revealed to have been taken to a military base. Major Collins commends them for thwarting the bombing of the weapons factory. He also informs Danny that General Porter will be in town and that he will present him with a medal. To protect them, he has Sergeant Stone assigned as their bodyguard. Back at the lab, Moebius and Uschi are discussing the machine and what it will mean for him. A soldier enters and informs him of General Porter's arrival. Back at Beth's house, Stone is settling in and getting on Beth's nerves with his sexist attitude. Back at the lab, Freuhoffer is examining Tunneler when Uschi enters and tries to again seduce him. Moebius enters and in a rage shoots Uschi through the head. Danny, Beth, and Stone eat and discuss how they can help their cause when Danny thinks Stone should be introduced to the puppets. Freuhoffer tries using the fluid he extracted from Tunneler in his machine to revive Uschi but it fails. Danny introduces a dumbfounded Stone to the puppets and tells him that the Nazis have one of them that needs to be recovered. Freuhoffer shows Moebius his newest creation, Bombshell, a puppet made in Uschi's image with machineguns in her chest. Moebius, while amused, still wants his machine completed.

Danny and the others take Blade and Pinhead to Chinatown to locate the Nazi base. They are ambushed by Bombshell and must retreat. Bombshell returns to the lab and Freuhoffer presents three other puppets Weremacht, a werewolf, Blitzkrieg, a tank, and Kamikaze, a walking bomb. Danny and the others are preparing for the award ceremony when Leech Woman tries to tell them something. During the awards, Freuhoffer's puppets attack, and kill Major Collins. Danny's puppets take them on but are beaten back. Porter, grateful to Danny, allows him to enter the army. Danny and the others ponder how to stop the Nazi puppets when Leech Woman pulls out Six-shooter's head. They locate the lab and take out the Nazi guards. Once inside, they locate and recover Tunneler, but are stopped by Moebius and Freuhoffer's puppets. The puppets fight and this time the Nazi puppets are beaten. Beth holds Freuhoffer at gunpoint, but lets him explain himself. Moebius and Stone fight and just as Stone gets the upper hand, Moebius stabs and kills him. Moebius comes at Danny, but is shot down by Six-shooter. Moebius, still alive, pulls out a gun and plans to shoot Danny, who states "Never screw with America". Blade then comes from behind and stabs Moebius. Beth and Freuhoffer come out and tells Kamikaze to detonate, destroying the lab and Moebius. Danny and Beth let Freuhoffer go, but as he leaves, the others didn't notice he has a bottle of the puppets' fluid.

Cast
 Kip Canyon as Danny
 Jean Louise O'Sullivan as Beth
 Terumi Shimazu as Ozu
 Scott Anthony King as Kommandant Moebius
 Paul Thomas Arnold as General Porter
 Brad Potts as Sergeant Stone
 Stephanie Sanditz as Uschi
 Kurt Sinclair as Major Collins
 Oto Brezina as Dr. Freuhoffer
 Glenn Zhang as Chinese Man
 Ian Roberts as SS Soldier #1
 Jesse Hlubik as SS Soldier #2
 Michael Ulmer as SS Soldier #3
 Danielle Stewart as Leech Woman (voice) (Uncredited)
 Kenichi Iwabuchi as Kamikaze (voice) (Uncredited)

Featured puppets
 Blade
 Pinhead
 Leech Woman
 Jester
 Tunneler
 Six Shooter

Other puppets
These new puppets are Nazi puppets, created by Professor Freuhoffer.
 Blitzkrieg
 Bombshell
 Weremacht
 Kamikaze

Among Doctor Freuhoffer's dolls is Freakshow's robotic baby, the Zuni killing doll and Retro-Tunneler's head from Killjoy 4, Trilogy of Terror and Retro Puppet Master.

Sequel
In September 2015, Charles Band of Full Moon announced that a sequel, Puppet Master: Axis Termination was in development. Filming began in 2016 and concluded the same year. The film was released as a three-episode series before being released in its full form on September 15, 2017.

It Was Followed by a spin-off titled Blade: The Iron Cross and released in 2020.

Reception
The film was met with mostly negative reviews. A reviewer for Dread Central gave it a score of one-half out of five, calling it "every bit as terrible as you might think, and then some". Film critic Dave Harlequin also gave a negative review with a score of 2.0/10, calling it "by far the worst release in the near 25-year lifespan of Puppet Master". Cinema Crazed praised Axis Rising, calling it "a solid horror film".

References

External links
 

2012 films
2012 horror films
Puppet Master (film series)
Puppet films
American supernatural horror films
American sequel films
American World War II films
American action horror films
Films directed by Charles Band
Films scored by Richard Band
2010s English-language films
2010s American films